Zebegény is a picturesque historic village in Pest county, Hungary.
It is located 60 km north of Budapest in the Danube Bend, next to the Duna-Ipoly National Park.  It is a favourite destination for tourists, who love the quiet and the fresh air. Due to its nice beaches, mountains, and forests, the village was nicknamed "The marble of the Danube Bend".

History
The town has a rich old history. By 1251 a Benedictine monastery had been built in the valley of the Mill Creek.  Records from the 8th century note the existence of the village. The first record of the village name dates from a letter of 1295, when it was called Zebeguen.

By 1251 a Benedictine monastery had been built in the valley of the Mill Creek. During the time of the Árpád dynasty, a Benedictine monastery in the Pécs-Baranya diocese was called Szöbegény. According to the archaeologists, the Benedictines moved from Szöbegény to here and recorded the place as Zebegény. A document dated 26 September 1295 calls the Benedictine monastery the "Monasterium de Zebeguennak" (Monastery of Zebegény). In the records of the monastery of Saint Martin at Pannonhalma, Zebegény is noted as officially founded in the Esztergom archdiocese.

In the late medieval ages, during the Turkish invasion, the village was almost destroyed.  Zebegény and the area repelled the Turkish invasion around 1685. Later the population was reduced by plague.

During the 18th century, the Crown recruited German farmers to populate the areas decimated by the Ottomans and restore farming along the Danube. The Germans were allowed to keep their language and religion, and became part of the group known as Danouswabians. Numerous German, Hungarian and Slavic migrants settled in the village. Records from the 19th century mention Zebegény as a German-Hungarian-Slavic village.

Since the Hungarian economic transition period in the late twentieth century, the village has its own municipality. It also has an elementary school, kindergarten and a library.

Since the early 1990s, Zebegény has become a popular destination among the people of Budapest. The first villas and week-end houses were built at that time. Due to its extraordinary landscape, healthy, clean air and its historic houses, the town is a favourite week-end retreat among the Budapesters.

Cultural life
The cultural life (galleries, festivals, museums, sport facilities) of the village is extraordinary comparing to a normal village. Visitors can find here the Museum of István Szőnyi and the Sailing Museum of Vincze Farkas. The village organize a summer Open University of Arts since 1968.
Furthermore, Zebegény has its own ski place, and a cycling route is crossing through the village.

The village has a Roman Catholic church in the main square that was renovated in 2010.

Landscape
Zebegény lies in a magnificent natural environment: It is at the border of the Danube, under the Börzsöny hills. The village is located right next to the Duna-Ipoly National Park, where there is a rich wild life. A small, rapid creek called Mill Creek crosses the village and it finally flows into the
Danube. From the beach visitors are able to see the Pilis hills by viewing to the other side of the river. Within a short walk distance (around 5 km from the main square) there are three caves above the village of Zebegény that were inhabited by monks in the medieval ages.

Sights
Dőry-Castle: Located at the shore of the Danube, the castle anchors the village.
Valley Bride: The seven-hole railway bridge was built in 1850, and is the second-largest rail bridge in Hungary. The Zebegény train station was built that year, in the style of the Austria-Hungary Monarchy.
Roman Catholic Church: The notable church, located in the main square, was renovated in 2010. 
Trianon Memorial: It marks the territorial losses forced on Hungary under the Treaty of Trianon after World War I.
Millennium Park: Located next to the train station

Transport
Zebegény is easily approachable by MÁV train as it is one of the stations in the Budapest-Bratislava train route. The train takes around 55 minutes from Budapest, starts daily in every hour from Budapest Nyugati train terminal.

Visitors can also come by car (M2 motorway and 12 main road) from Budapest (around an hour drive). Bicycle is also an option for getting here, as a wonderful cycling route is crossing through the town (Cycling route: Budapest-Szob).

Notable natives and residents
 *Róbert Berény, a Hungarian painter and one of Budapest modernists known as The Eight (Nyolcak), lived and worked here for several years after World War I.
 István Szőnyi (1894 – 1960), painter
 Ferenc Glatz, former president of the Hungarian Academy of Sciences

Picture gallery

External links 
 Homepage of the Municipality of Zebegény 
 Homepage of the Ski of Zebegény 

Populated places in Pest County